Coach Center is a metro station in Hangzhou, China, and is an interchange between Line 1 and Line 9 of the Hangzhou Metro. It is located in the Jianggan District of Hangzhou. It is connected to Hangzhou Coach Center. The metro station opened in November 2012, together with the rest of the stations on Line 1. Line 9 was opened on 10 July 2021 and uses Platform 3 and Platform 4 which was previously used by Line 1 trains to Linping, allowing for same direction cross-platform interchange between the two lines.

History

Coach Station
Construction on the Hangzhou Coach Center began on 18 December 2003.

Metro Station
The metro station opened in November 2012, together with the rest of the stations on Line 1. It has become a transfer station between Line 1 and Line 9 after 10 July 2021.

References

Railway stations in Zhejiang
Railway stations in China opened in 2012
Hangzhou Metro stations
Bus stations in China